Kandi is a sub-divisional town and a municipality in Murshidabad district in the Indian state of West Bengal. It is the headquarters of the Kandi subdivision and is located on the east bank of Kana Mayurakshi River. It is also known as the rice store of Murshidabad district, owing to its large production of rice. It is situated 30 km away from Berhampore, the district headquarter of Murshidabad and approximately 195 km from Kolkata, the capital of West Bengal.

Geography

Location

Kandi is present in the Mayurakshi River basin. Mayurakshi River and its tributaries are bound in this area. This area is part of the Rarh Anchal.

Kandi is a small sub-divisional administrative headquarters in the district of Murshidabad, West Bengal.

It is in close proximity to two other districts namely Burdwan at 32 km and Birbhum at 21 km.

The town is renowned for being one of the oldest municipal bodies in India. It has acquired the status of a municipality in 1869.

The area is critically prone to perpetual flood and drainage congestion and remain totally cut-off for many days together from other parts of the district during flood. The aforesaid area is drained by three main river systems namely, the Mayurakshi - Bele, the Brahmani- Dwarka and the Bakreshwar – Kopai – Kuye. All the three systems combine into one and finally outfalls into the river Bhagirathi through the Babla – Uttarasan system. The river systems described above carry huge discharge during monsoon causing wide spread flood and drainage congestion in Kandi and adjoining areas as most of the embankments, constructed decades ago through ex-zamindary or other sources, are in dilapidated conditions. The perpetual occurrence of flood and drainage congestion cause untold misery to the people. The average annual damage is to the tune of Rs. 97.55 Crore. Transport of relief materials and rapid evacuation of affected people becomes really challenging task in such time.

Area overview
The area shown in the map alongside, covering Berhampore and Kandi subdivisions, is spread across both the natural physiographic regions of the district, Rarh and Bagri. The headquarters of Murshidabad district, Berhampore, is in this area. The entire area is overwhelmingly rural with over 80% of the population living in the rural areas.

Note: The map alongside presents some of the notable locations in the subdivisions. All places marked in the map are linked in the larger full screen map.

Demographics
According to the 2011 Census of India, Kandi had a total population of 55,632, of which 28,442 (51%) were males and 27,190 (49%) were females. Population in the age range 0–6 years was 5,889. The total number of literate persons in Kandi was 40,816 (82.05% of the population over 6 years).

 India census, Kandi had a population of 50,345. Males constitute 53% of the population and females 47%. Kandi has an average literacy rate of 65%, higher than the national average of 59.5%: male literacy is 70%, and female literacy is 60%. In Kandi, 14% of the population is under 6 years of age.

Infrastructure
According to the District Census Handbook, Murshidabad,  2011, Kandi covered an area of 12.97 km2. It had 118 km roads with both open and covered drains. The protected water-supply involved overhead tank, tap water from treated source, hand pump. It had 7,788 domestic electric connections, 1,985 road lighting points. Among the medical facilities it had 2 hospitals (with 200 beds), 2 dispensaries/ health centres, 1 family welfare centre, 1 maternity & child welfare centre, 1 maternity home, 1 TB hospital/ clinic, 1 nursing home, 1 veterinary hospital, 132 medicine shops. Among the educational facilities, it had 30 primary schools, 1 middle school, 4 secondary schools, 4 senior secondary schools, 2 general degree colleges. It had  19  non-formal education centre (Sarva Shiksha Abhiyan), 1 specialised school for disabled. Among the social, recreational & cultural facilities it had 1 cinema theatre, 1 auditorium/ community hall, 3 public libraries. It produced handloom, tobacco, bell metal products. It had the branch offices of 4 nationalised banks, 1 private commercial bank, 1 cooperative bank, 2 agricultural credit society, 45 non-agricultural credit society.

Economy

Banking & financial services
State Bank of India, Main Branch
State Bank of India, Bus Stand Branch
State Bank of India, C.C. Rasorah
Punjab National Bank
INDIAN Bank, Main Road - Beside of LICI Building
Bank of Baroda, Khorsa-High Road
Bank of India, Petrol Pump-High Road
Bangiya Gramin Vikash Bank, Zemo Branch -School Road
Oriental Bank of Commerce, Hospital Road
IDBI Bank, Hospital Road
HDFC BANK LTD, Hospital Road
Canara Bank, School Road
Kandi Co-Operative Credit Society, Girls School More
 Life Insurance Corporation Of India, Main Road Branch
Axis Bank, Girls School More
Bandhan Bank Near Police Station
new India Insurance Company Limited, Petrol Pump-High Road.
K.D.C.M.P.U.Ltd (Amul)

Tourism and festivals 
Some popular tourist spots and festivals of Kandi are listed here:
 Netaji Shubash Park
 Narayandhar Park
 Radhaballav Mandir 
 Kandi Rajbari 
 Shyamsagar Par 
 Radhasagar Par 
 Jemo Rajbati 
 Dakhina Kali Mandir 
 Gopal Tungi Mandir 
 Panchamukhi Shib Mandir
 Bagdanga Rudradev Mandir
 Kali puja of Eroali
 Kali puja of Gokarna
 Sarbamangala Temple of Jajan

Transport

Roadways

SH-11 passes through Kandi. Kandi Town is gateway of Murshidabad District, as 10 districts of South Bengal is directly connected to. Kandi is well connected to places like Berhampur, Suri, Bolpur, Tarapith, Rampurhat, Burdwan, Katwa, Asansol, etc. by road.

Public transport systems in Kandi Town include the Government and private buses, electric rickshaws, taxis and auto rickshaws.

Railways 
There is no railway station. The nearest ones are at:  at 25 km, Khagraghat Road (KGLE) railway station at 28 km on Barharwa–Azimganj–Katwa loop line, Berhampur, at 34 km on Sealdah–Lalgola line.  at 39 km on Sahibganj loop line.  (well known as Futisanko) at 34 km on Ahmadpur–Katwa line.

Education

Colleges

Kandi Raj College was established in 1950 by the Kandi Raj family of Kandi. Affiliated to the University of Kalyani, it has the following departments: Physics, Chemistry, Mathematics, Computer Science, Bengali, English, Sanskrit, History, Geography, Political science, Philosophy and Economics.

Raja Birendra Chandra College was established in 1965 at Kandi. It was earlier known as Kandi Raj College of Commerce. Affiliated to the University of Kalyani, it offers honours courses in Bengali, English, Sanskrit, history, geography and BCom.

Bimal Chandra College of Law was established at Kandi in 2002 with the untiring efforts of Atish Chandra Sinha, a doyen of the Kandi Raj family. It is affiliated with the University of Kalyani and approved by the Bar Council of India.

Schools
Kandi Raj High School(H.S)
Kandi Raja Manindra Chandra Girls' High School(H.S),
Jemo N.N High School(H.S)
Sri Bishnu High School
Bahara Adarsha Vidyapith
Bahara Girls School
Bagdanga R.S.S Vidyapith(H.S)
Bagdanga P.C. Girls School
Chatinakandi Gurupada High School
Namukandi High School
Rasorah Ambika High School 
Saraswati Devi Public School.H.S. (Affiliated to C.B.S.E ) 
Jagriti Public School (Affiliated to C.B.S.E)

The educational revolution of this place started when Kandi Raj High School was established by converting a theater owned by the Zamindars of the Kandi Raj family. This was done on an appeal by Pandit Ishwar Chandra Vidyasagar, the eminent educationist and social reformer during the renaissance in Bengal.

The Zamindar family, commonly referred to as Rajas, have contributed to the spread of education in a commendable way. They also took initiative for female education in and around the Kandi subdivision.

Currently, female education has picked up momentum. There are many educational libraries, sporting clubs in neighbouring villages.

Personalities and notable peoples
 Ramendra Sundar Tribedi (Scientist & writer)
 Byomkes Chakrabarti (linguist and educationist)
 Atish Chandra Sinha (nationalist and politician)
 Bikash Chandra Sinha (physicist and scientist)

Arts and culture

The region has a special reputation for making a type of sweet confectionery called Monohara.

The city can be considered one of the major cultural centers of Murshidabad. Renowned groups have originated from this town. These groups hold theater festivals throughout the year, mostly during the winter, in Kandi. On Republic Day (January 26), major sports events, programs and parades are held here. Kandi is also commonly known for the famous Kali Puja of the Roychowdhury royal family, the erstwhile rulers of Kandi and the surrounding areas.

Healthcare
There is a government hospital Kandi Subdivision Hospital in the heart of the town and people from the neighbouring towns and villages visit there for medical treatment. There is also a non-government nursing home named Kabita Nursing Home.

See also
 Kandi (Community development block)

References

External links
 

Cities and towns in Murshidabad district